Pocket Communications was a PCS CDMA 1xRTT and, EVDO provider of unlimited cellular phone service based in San Antonio, Texas, United States. It offered service plans similar to those of Cricket Communications and  MetroPCS which mostly consist of unlimited local phone service without having to sign up for long-term contracts. It was merged with Cricket Communications in late 2010, with Cricket holding an initial 76% stake in the joint venture and Pocket holding 24%.

History 

Pocket Communications began in San Antonio, TX in June 2006. Besides covering the greater San Antonio area, they serviced to the north along major roads, reaching as far as Fredericksburg, Texas, and to the south including Laredo, Texas and the Rio Grande Valley. Pocket had roaming agreements with MetroPCS, SprintPCS and Verzion to boost coverage. According to information advertised by Pocket over 170,000 subscribed in its first month being in business. 1xRTT data access was available while unlimited directory assistance was also available at an additional charge. Additionally, Pocket offered a prepaid funds account, also known as the Value Pocket, from which can be drawn such features as international calling, long distance, outgoing text messaging (incoming messages are free) and picture messages if such features are not added to the subscriber's plan. Pocket expanded its operations to the northeastern part of the United States adding a regional headquarters in Bloomfield, CT and also extending their coverage to Corpus Christi, Texas. In September 2010, Pocket announced that they would shutter their operations in Connecticut and Massachusetts due to the weak economy, competition and high cost of building an infrastructure. Pocket announced that service in these areas would be discontinued in late October. The New England spectrum and network were sold to MetroPCS after being shut down. MetroPCS relaunched service on the former Pocket network in March 2011. In late 2010 the Pocket and Cricket merger was completed.

Joint Venture 
October 1 Leap (Cricket) acquires Pocket Communications South Texas market.

Markets 
The markets in Texas for Pocket Communications included San Antonio, Corpus Christi, Laredo, and the Rio Grande Valley.
Pocket also served Hartford, Connecticut, New Haven, Connecticut, Waterbury, Connecticut, and Springfield, Massachusetts markets.

See also

Leap Wireless, Parent Company of
Cricket Communications
Jump Mobile
MetroPCS

References

Companies based in San Antonio
Defunct mobile phone companies of the United States